Moduza lymire is butterfly endemic to Sulawesi, Indonesia, described by William Chapman Hewitson in 1859.

References

External links
 "Butterflies of Southeastern Sulawesi". Systematics of Neotropical Butterflies. University of Florida.

Limenitidinae
Taxa named by William Chapman Hewitson
Butterflies of Indonesia
Butterflies described in 1859